George William Lukin was the Dean of Wells between 1799 and his death on 27 November 1812.

He was born in Braintree, Essex on 26 September 1739 and educated at Eton and Christ's College, Cambridge. He was Prebendary of Westminster from 1797 until his appointment as dean.

References

1739 births
People from Braintree, Essex
People educated at Eton College
Alumni of Christ's College, Cambridge
Deans of Wells
1812 deaths